The 2024 Bolivarian Games will be the 1st edition of the multi-sport event meant for sports, or disciplines or events within a sport, that are not contested in the Olympic Games, governed by the Organización Deportiva Bolivariana (ODEBO). They will be held in Ayacucho, Peru from 6 to 15 December 2024 in commemoration of the bicentennial of Battle of Ayacucho.

Host city selection
In June 2021, the mayor of Ayacucho Yuri Gutiérrez presented to the Peruvian Olympic Committee the intentions of the city to host the 2025 Bolivarian Games. On 29 July 2021, during the swearing-in of President Pedro Castillo, the Governor of Ayacucho department Carlos Rúa confirmed the intentions of the city to host the 2025 Bolivarian Games, on the occasion of the 200th anniversary of the Battle of Ayacucho.

The final bidding was presented on 18 December 2021 at the ODEBO General Assembly held in Guayaquil, Ecuador, a city that also presented a bidding to host the 2025 Bolivarian Games. On the same day, the ODEBO Executive Committee selected Ayacucho to host a special and unprecedented edition of the Bolivarian Games for non-Olympic sports, and named Guayaquil as host city for the 2025 Bolivarian Games.

Participating nations
The participation of all 7 nations of the Organización Deportiva Bolivariana is expected.

Sports
Ayacucho 2024 proposes the following 25 sports in 27 disciplines:

Slalom
Rafting

Marketing
The Games' bid slogan was Bolivarian Games For All – Ayacucho 2024.

References

Bolivarian Games
2024 in multi-sport events
International sports competitions hosted by Peru
Multi-sport events in Peru